The Rebel was an American high-wing, V-tailed, single-seat glider that was created by Bob Brown in 1957.

Design and development
The Rebel was created by joining the wing from the Lyle Maxey designed Jennie Mae to a fuselage from the Irv Prue designed Prue 215.  It had a wingspan of with an aspect ratio of 23.8.  The airfoil was a NACA 65 (3)-518 and achieved a best L/D of 37.5. Only one was built and it is no longer listed on the Federal Aviation Administration registry.

Operational history
The Rebel was flown extensively in competitions. At a contest in Tulsa, OK over Memorial Day weekend in 1959, Brown placed 3rd flying the Rebel. Brown flew it in the 1959 US National Soaring Championships at Elmira, NY, placing 24th. At the Southwestern and Texas Soaring Championships held in September 1959 in Grand Prairie, TX, Brown placed 2nd flying the Rebel.

Over Memorial Day weekend in 1960, Brown took first place in a contest at Fort Rucker, AL. Brown then flew the Rebel to 33rd place in the US National Soaring Championships held at Odessa, TX. Over Labor Day weekend 1960, Brown and the Rebel took first place in a contest at Marietta, GA.

In 1961, Brown flew the Rebel in the National Soaring Championships held at Wichita, KS.  He placed 21st.

By 1964, Brown had the Rebel up for sale.

Specifications (Rebel)

See also

References

1950s United States sailplanes
Homebuilt aircraft
Aircraft first flown in 1957
V-tail aircraft